Joab Lawler (June 12, 1796 – May 8, 1838) was a U.S. Representative from Alabama. He also served in the Alabama House of Representatives and Alabama Senate.

Born in Union County, North Carolina, Lawler moved with his father to Tennessee and in 1815 to Mississippi Territory. He attended public schools. He studied theology and was licensed to preach.

In 1820, he moved to Mardisville, Alabama and pursued his ministerial duties.
He served as member of the State House of Representatives 1826-1831.
He served in the State Senate 1831 and 1832. He was the Receiver of Public Moneys for the Coosa land district 1832-1835 and served as treasurer of the University of Alabama at Tuscaloosa 1833-1836.

Lawler was elected as a Jacksonian to the Twenty-fourth Congress.
He was re-elected as a Whig to the Twenty-fifth Congress and served from March 4, 1835, until his death in Washington, D.C., on May 8, 1838. He was interred in the Congressional Cemetery.

See also
List of United States Congress members who died in office (1790–1899)

References

External links

1796 births
1838 deaths
Burials at the Congressional Cemetery
Jacksonian members of the United States House of Representatives from Alabama
19th-century American politicians
Whig Party members of the United States House of Representatives from Alabama